St Ann's or St Anns may refer to:

Places
Sainte-Anne Parish, New Brunswick, formerly called St. Ann's Parish
St. Anns, Ontario, West Lincoln, Ontario, Canada
St. Anns, Nova Scotia, Canada
St Ann's, Nottingham, England, UK
St Ann's, London, a neighbourhood in the London Borough of Haringey, England, UK

Churches
St. Ann's Anglican Church, Belmopan, Belize
St. Ann's Church, Dawson Street, Dublin, Ireland
St Ann's Church, Manchester, UK

United States
St. Ann's Cathedral (Great Falls, Montana)
St. Ann's Church (Bronx, New York)
St. Ann's and the Holy Trinity Church, Brooklyn Heights, Brooklyn
Saint Ann Parish, Jamaica
St. Ann's Church (Manhattan)
St. Ann's Roman Catholic Church (Manhattan)
St. Ann's Episcopal Church (Nashville, Tennessee)
St. Ann's Episcopal Church (Richford, Vermont)

Institutions
St Ann's College, North Adelaide, Australia
St. Ann's High School, Secunderabad, India
Saint Ann's School (Brooklyn), Brooklyn Heights, Brooklyn
St Ann's Hospital, Dorset
St. Ann's Infant and Maternity Home, Avondale, Maryland, USA
St. Ann's School, Ahmedabad, a private high school in Ahmedabad, India
St Anns (shopping centre), Harrow, England

Other uses
St Ann's Ground, cricket ground
St. Ann's Warehouse, former church, now an arts building in New York
St. Ann's Academy (Victoria, British Columbia), building in Victoria, British Columbia
St. Ann's Federation Building, Steuben County, New York

See also
Saint Ann's Bay, Jamaica
St Ann's Head Lighthouse, Wales, United Kingdom
St. Ann's Rangers F.C., a football club in Trinidad and Tobago
St Ann's Road railway station
St. Ann's Well, Malvern
St. Ann's Well Gardens, Hove
Anna (disambiguation)
Fort Sainte Anne (disambiguation)
Saint Anne (disambiguation)
St Anne's (disambiguation)
St. Ann's Academy (disambiguation)
Sainte-Anne (disambiguation)
Santa Ana (disambiguation)